"The Songs That We Sing" is the first single from the album 5:55 by Charlotte Gainsbourg.

Critical reception
Rolling Stone placed "The Songs That We Sing" at #78 on its 100 Best Songs of 2007 list.

Chart performance
"The Songs That We Sing" debuted at #36 on the French Singles Chart before climbing to and peaking at #30 in its third week.  The song spent a total of 30 weeks on the chart.

Track listings
French CD single
 "The Songs That We Sing" - 2:57
 "Set Yourself On Fire" - 4:08

UK CD single
 "The Songs That We Sing" - 3:01
 "Jamais" - 4:38

Song usage
"The Songs That We Sing" was used in the 2009 film The Uninvited.

Charts

References

2006 singles
Charlotte Gainsbourg songs
Songs written by Jarvis Cocker
Songs written by Neil Hannon
Song recordings produced by Nigel Godrich
Air (French band) songs
2006 songs